Charlie McGee may refer to:

Charlie McGee (Firestarter), character from science fiction-horror thriller novel by Stephen King
Charles McGee (disambiguation)

See also
 Charlie McGeever
 Charles McKee